The white-throated toucan (Ramphastos tucanus) is a near-passerine bird in the family Ramphastidae found in South America throughout the Amazon Basin including the adjacent Tocantins and Araguaia River drainage. It prefers tropical humid forest, but also occurs in woodland and locally in riverine forest within cerrado.

Taxonomy
The white-throated toucan was formally described by the Swedish naturalist Carl Linnaeus in 1758 in the tenth edition of his Systema Naturae. He placed it with the other toucans in the genus Ramphastos and coined the binomial name Ramphastos tucanus. Linnaeus specified the "habitat" as South America. The type locality was restricted to Suriname by the American ornithologists Ludlow Griscom  and James Greenway  in 1937. The genus name is from Ancient Greek ῥαμφηστης/rhamphēstēs meaning "snouted" (from ῥαμφη/rhampē meaning "bill"). The specific epithet tucanus is from the Guarani language and may mean "bonenose".

Subspecies 

Three subspecies are recognized by the International Ornithological Committee (IOC), the South American Classification Committee of the American Ornithological Society, and the Clements taxonomy:

 "Red-billed toucan" (R. t. tucanus) Linnaeus, 1758 – found in south-eastern Venezuela, the Guianas and northern Brazil
 "Cuvier's toucan" (R. t. cuvieri) Wagler, 1827  – originally described as a separate species. Found in upper Amazonia from western Venezuela to northern Bolivia
 "Inca toucan" (R. t. inca) Gould, 1846 –  originally described as a separate species. Found in northern and central Bolivia

BirdLife International's Handbook of the Birds of the World (HBW) treats the red-billed toucan as a species R. tucanus and the other two taxa as subspecies of "Cuvier's toucan" R. cuvieri. All three taxa were formerly considered to be three separate species. The red-billed toucan and Cuvier's toucan, which differ principally in the bill colour, interbreed freely wherever they meet and therefore now merit only subspecies status. Some authorities consider the Inca toucan to represent a stable hybrid population between the other two subspecies and do not recognize it as a separate subspecies.

Description
Like other toucans, the white-throated toucan is brightly marked and has a huge bill. However, the subspecies R. t. cuvieri is larger, with males averaging  and females averaging . The only species of toucan that surpasses the white-throated in size is the toco toucan, however the R. t. cuvieri subspecies of white-throated toucan appears to perhaps be even heavier than the Toco species.

It has black plumage with a white throat and breast bordered below with a narrow red line. The rump is bright yellow and the crissum (the area around the cloaca) is red. The bare skin around the eye is blue. The bill has a yellow tip, upper ridge and base of the upper mandible, and the base of the lower mandible is blue. The rest of the bill is mainly black in  R. t. cuvieri and mainly reddish-brown in R. t. tucanus, with intergrades showing a mixed coloration. Males are larger and longer-billed than females, but otherwise the sexes are alike.

Juveniles are noticeably shorter-billed, more sooty-black, and have duller plumage.

The white-throated toucan of the race cuvieri is virtually identical to the related channel-billed toucan of the race culminatus, but the latter is smaller and has a proportionally shorter bill with a more strongly keeled culmen. The call is often the best distinction between the species. White-throated has a yelping eeoo, hue hue, whereas channel-billed has a croaking song.

Behaviour
This species is primarily an arboreal fruit-eater, but will also take insects, lizards, eggs, and small birds.

Breeding
The 2–4 white eggs are laid in an unlined cavity high in a decayed section of a living tree, or in an old woodpecker nest in a dead tree.

Both sexes incubate the eggs for at 14–15 days, and the toucan chicks remain in the nest after hatching. They are blind and naked at birth, with short bills, and have specialised pads on their heels to protect them from the rough floor of the nest. They are fed by both parents, and fledge after about 6 weeks. The parents continue feeding the juveniles for several weeks after they have left the nest.

Aviculture
White-throated toucans (specifically the red billed subspecies) are sometimes kept as pets. However, like the chestnut-mandibled toucan they are considered to be noisy, when compared to other frequently kept toucans such as the keel-billed toucan and toco toucan. It is illegal to take toucans or any other protected wild bird species from their natural habitat.

Status

The IUCN follows HBW taxonomy, and so has assessed the "red-billed" and "Cuvier's" toucans separately. The "red-billed" was for a time treated as Vulnerable, but since 2021 has been treated as being of Least Concern. However, "The primary threat to this species is accelerating deforestation in the Amazon basin" and "is also suffering from hunting pressure and from trapping for the pet trade". In contrast, "Cuvier's" has always been assessed as being of Least Concern, and no immediate threats have been identified.

The white-throated toucan is listed in CITES Appendix II.

References

External links

 Hear this bird sing
 Stamps-"Ramphastos tucanus" (for Brazil, Guyana, Peru, Suriname) with (~)RangeMap

Bibliography
 Bibliography of online, ornithological articles which explore the natural history of the Red-billed toucan, Ramphastos tucanus tucanus and Cuvier's toucan, Ramphastos tucanus cuvieri.
 John Gould and Henry Constantine Richter, A Monography of the Ramphastidae, or Family of Toucans, London 1854
 ** newly edited with 51 coloured prints and a preface by Jonathan Elphick: Taschen, Köln, Germany 2011 

white-throated toucan
Birds of the Amazon Basin
Birds of the Guianas
white-throated toucan
white-throated toucan
Birds of Brazil